Ronald Leigh-Hunt (5 October 1920 – 12 September 2005) was a British film and television actor.

His father was a stockbroker and he attended the Italia Conti Academy. He began acting whilst serving in the army. Though never a major star, he appeared in over a hundred television and film productions over a forty-year period, including as King Arthur in The Adventures of Sir Lancelot in the mid-1950s, and General Hospital in the early 1970s.

He appeared in Danger Man and twice in Doctor Who, as Commander Radnor in The Seeds of Death (1969) and as Commander Stevenson in Revenge of the Cybermen (1975); and starred as Colonel Buchan in every episode of the 1960s and 1970s children's TV series Freewheelers. Later he appeared in "You Lose Some, You Win Some", an episode of series 2 of Minder.

His film appearances included The League of Gentlemen (1960), Le Mans (1971) and The Omen (1976).

In his later years he was a familiar sight at the Green Room Club where he was an honorary member.

His cousin is the actress Barbara Leigh-Hunt.

Selected filmography

 No Orchids for Miss Blandish (1948) - Grisson's Guard (uncredited)
 Blackout (1950) - Dr. Langley
 No Trace (1950) - Party Guest (uncredited)
 Paul Temple Returns (1952) - Inspector Ross
 Tread Softly (1952) - Inspector Hinton
 The Broken Horseshoe (1953) - Sgt. Lewis
 Three Steps to the Gallows (1953) - Capt. Adams
 Forces' Sweetheart (1953) - Navy C.O.
 Flannelfoot (1953) - Dr. Milligan
 Johnny on the Spot (1954) - Jeremy Oulton (uncredited)
 Tiger by the Tail (1955) - Doctor Scott, psychiatrist
 Shadow of a Man (1956) - Norman Farrel
 Assignment Redhead (1956) - Col. Julian Fentriss M.I.5.
 Action Stations (1956) - Kleivar
 Zoo Baby (1957) - Supt. Copton
 A Touch of Larceny (1960) - 2nd Editor (uncredited)
 Sink the Bismarck! (1960) - Somers, Officer on 'King George V' (uncredited)
 The League of Gentlemen (1960) - Police Superintendent - Final Scene (uncredited)
 Oscar Wilde (1960) - Lionel Johnson
 Piccadilly Third Stop (1960) - Police Sergeant 
 The Hand (1960) - Munyard
 Very Important Person (1961) - Clynes
 We Joined the Navy (1962) - Commander Royal Navy
 Der Schwur des Soldaten Pooley (1963) - (uncredited)
 Seventy Deadly Pills (1964) - Sergeant
 The Third Secret (1964) - Police Officer
 The Pumpkin Eater (1964) - 2nd Man in Bar (uncredited)
 Curse of Simba (1965) - Doctor
 The Liquidator (1965) - Mac
 Khartoum (1966) - Lord Northbrook (uncredited)
 Where the Bullets Fly (1966) - Thursby
 Hostile Witness (1968) - Dr. Wimborne
 Clegg (1970) - Inspector Kert
 Le Mans (1971) - David Townsend
 Universal Soldier (1971) - St. George
 Baxter! (1973) - Mr. Fishie
 The Omen (1976) - Gentleman at Rugby Match
 The Message (1976) - Heraclius
 Who Is Killing the Great Chefs of Europe? (1978) - Priest marrying Bobby and Natasha (uncredited)
Frankenstein (1992) - Alphonse

References

External links
 
 
 
Feature in The Stage
Times obituary (paywall)

1920 births
2005 deaths
English male film actors
English male television actors
Alumni of the Italia Conti Academy of Theatre Arts
British Army soldiers